Fugitive Lady is an American 1934 film directed by Albert S. Rogell and starring Florence Rice, Neil Hamilton and Donald Cook. Lucille Ball had an uncredited role in the film.

Cast
Florence Rice as Ann Duncan
Neil Hamilton as Donald Brooks
Donald Cook as Jack Howard
William Demarest as Steve Rogers
Clara Blandick as Aunt Margaret
Nella Walker as Mrs Brooks
Rita La Roy as Sylvia Brooks

References

1934 films
American black-and-white films
American drama films
1934 drama films
Films directed by Albert S. Rogell
Columbia Pictures films
1930s English-language films
1930s American films